Geodia composita is a species of sponge in the family Geodiidae. The species was first described by Bösraug in 1913. It is found off the coasts of Mozambique.

References

Tetractinellida
Sponges described in 1913